Guadalupe "Lupita" Pallás Téllez (29 April 1926 – 23 November 1985) was a Mexican actress and dancer. The wife of character actor Óscar Ortiz de Pinedo and the mother of comedian Jorge Ortiz de Pinedo, she died (along with her daughter, Laila Guadalupe Ortiz de Pinedo Pallás) during a terrorist attack aboard their flight from Greece to Egypt.

Filmography

Television work

References

External links

1926 births
1985 deaths
Mexican film actresses
Mexican television actresses
Actresses from Mexico City
20th-century Mexican actresses
Mass murder victims
Victims of aviation accidents or incidents in Malta
Victims of aviation accidents or incidents in 1985
Terrorism deaths in Malta
Mexican murder victims